Minnehaha County is a county on the eastern border of the state of South Dakota. As of the 2020 census, the population was 197,214, making it the state's most populous county. It contains over 20% of the state's population. Its county seat is Sioux Falls, South Dakota's largest city. The county was created in 1862 and organized in 1868. Its name was derived from the Sioux  word Mnihaha, meaning "rapid water," or "waterfall" (often incorrectly translated as "laughing water").

Minnehaha County is part of the Sioux Falls Metropolitan Statistical Area, the state's largest.

Geography

Minnehaha County lies on the east side of South Dakota. Its eastern boundary abuts Minnesota as well as the northern and western boundaries of Iowa. The Big Sioux River flows south-southeast through the east central part of the county. Its terrain consists of rolling hills, devoted to agriculture except around built-up areas, and dotted with lakes and ponds in its western portion. Its terrain generally slopes southward, and the east and west edges slope to the river valley through the center of the county. Its highest point is in the northwest corner, at 1,752' (534m) ASL.

Major highways

 Interstate 229 Dwtn.
 South Dakota Highway 11
 South Dakota Highway 19
 South Dakota Highway 38
 South Dakota Highway 42
 South Dakota Highway 115

Airports
Sioux Falls Regional Airport (FSD)
Wheelborg Landing Field, a small airport in Dell Rapids

Adjacent counties

 Moody County - north
 Pipestone County, Minnesota - northeast
 Rock County, Minnesota - east
 Lyon County, Iowa - southeast
 Lincoln County - south
 Turner County - southwest
 McCook County - west
 Lake County - northwest

Protected areas

 Beaver Creek State Recreation Area
 Big Sioux State Recreation Area
 Diamond Lake State Game Production Area
 Falls Park
 Island Lake State Game Production Area (part)
 Palisades State Park
 Pederson State Game Production Area
 Scott Lake State Game Production Area
 Twin Lakes State Game Production Area
 Wall Lake State Lakeside Use Area

Lakes, rivers and streams

 Beaver Creek
 Beaver Lake
 Big Sioux River
 Buffalo Lake
 Clear Lake
 Covell Lake
 Diamond Lake
 Fenstrman Slough
 Grass Lake
 Island Lake (partial)
 Lake Lorane
 Loss Lake
 Lost Lake
 Rehfeldt Slough
 Scott Lake
 Skunk Creek
 Split Rock Creek
 Twin Lake
 Wall Lake

Demographics

2000 census
As of the 2000 census, there were 148,281 people, 57,996 households, and 37,581 families in the county. The population density was 183 people per square mile (71/km2). There were 60,237 housing units at an average density of 74 per square mile (29/km2). The racial makeup of the county was 93.03% White, 1.51% Black or African American, 1.85% Native American, 1.01% Asian, 0.05% Pacific Islander, 1.04% from other races, and 1.51% from two or more races. 2.15% of the population were Hispanic or Latino of any race.

There were 57,996 households, out of which 33.80% had children under the age of 18 living with them, 51.80% were married couples living together, 9.50% had a female householder with no husband present, and 35.20% were non-families. 27.80% of all households were made up of individuals, and 8.60% had someone living alone who was 65 years of age or older. The average household size was 2.46 and the average family size was 3.04.

The county population contained 26.20% under the age of 18, 10.80% from 18 to 24, 32.00% from 25 to 44, 20.00% from 45 to 64, and 11.00% who were 65 years of age or older. The median age was 34 years. For every 100 females, there were 98.10 males. For every 100 females age 18 and over, there were 95.40 males.

The median income for a household in the county was $42,566, and the median income for a family was $52,031. Males had a median income of $32,208 versus $24,691 for females. The per capita income for the county was $20,713. About 5.00% of families and 7.50% of the population were below the poverty line, including 8.90% of those under age 18 and 7.20% of those age 65 or over.

2010 census
As of the 2010 census, there were 169,468 people, 67,028 households, and 42,052 families in the county. The racial makeup of the county was 88.1% white, 3.8% Black or African American, 2.5% American Indian, 1.5% Asian, 0.1% Pacific islander, 1.8% from other races, and 2.3% from two or more races. Those of Hispanic or Latino origin made up 4.1% of the population. In terms of ancestry, 43.8% were German, 17.7% were Norwegian, 11.6% were Irish, 6.8% were Dutch, 6.3% were English, and 3.2% were American.

Of the 67,028 households, 32.7% had children under the age of 18 living with them, 47.7% were married couples living together, 10.5% had a female householder with no husband present, 37.3% were non-families, and 29.3% of all households were made up of individuals. The average household size was 2.43 and the average family size was 3.03. The median age was 34.5 years.

The median income for a household in the county was $51,799 and the median income for a family was $64,645. Males had a median income of $40,187 versus $31,517 for females. The per capita income for the county was $26,392. About 6.9% of families and 9.7% of the population were below the poverty line, including 12.2% of those under age 18 and 7.6% of those age 65 or over.

Politics
Minnehaha is somewhat conservative for an urban county. Only four Democratic presidential candidates in five different elections have carried the county since 1940.

Communities

Cities

 Baltic
 Brandon
 Colton
 Crooks
 Dell Rapids
 Garretson
 Hartford
 Sioux Falls (county seat)
 Valley Springs

Towns
 Humboldt
 Sherman

Census-designated places
 Anderson

 Lyons

 Meadow View Addition
 Pine Lakes Addition
 Renner Corner

 Rowena

Unincorporated communities

 Andy's Acres
 Benclare
 Booge
 Corson
 Ellis
 Huntimer
 Midway
 Morefield
 Renner

Townships

 Benton
 Brandon
 Buffalo
 Burk
 Clear Lake
 Dell Rapids
 Edison
 Grand Meadow
 Hartford
 Highland
 Humboldt
 Logan
 Lyons
 Mapleton
 Palisade
 Red Rock
 Sioux Falls
 Split Rock
 Sverdrup
 Taopi
 Valley Springs
 Wall Lake
 Wayne
 Wellington

Historical townsites

 East Sioux Falls
 Eminija
 South Sioux Falls
 West Sioux Falls
 Wingert

See also
 National Register of Historic Places listings in Minnehaha County, South Dakota

References

External links

 Minnehaha County, SD government website
 Envision 2035 Comprehensive Plan webpage
 Capture Minnehaha County website
 

 
1868 establishments in Dakota Territory
Populated places established in 1868
South Dakota placenames of Native American origin
Sioux Falls, South Dakota metropolitan area